= Albania–Indonesia relations =

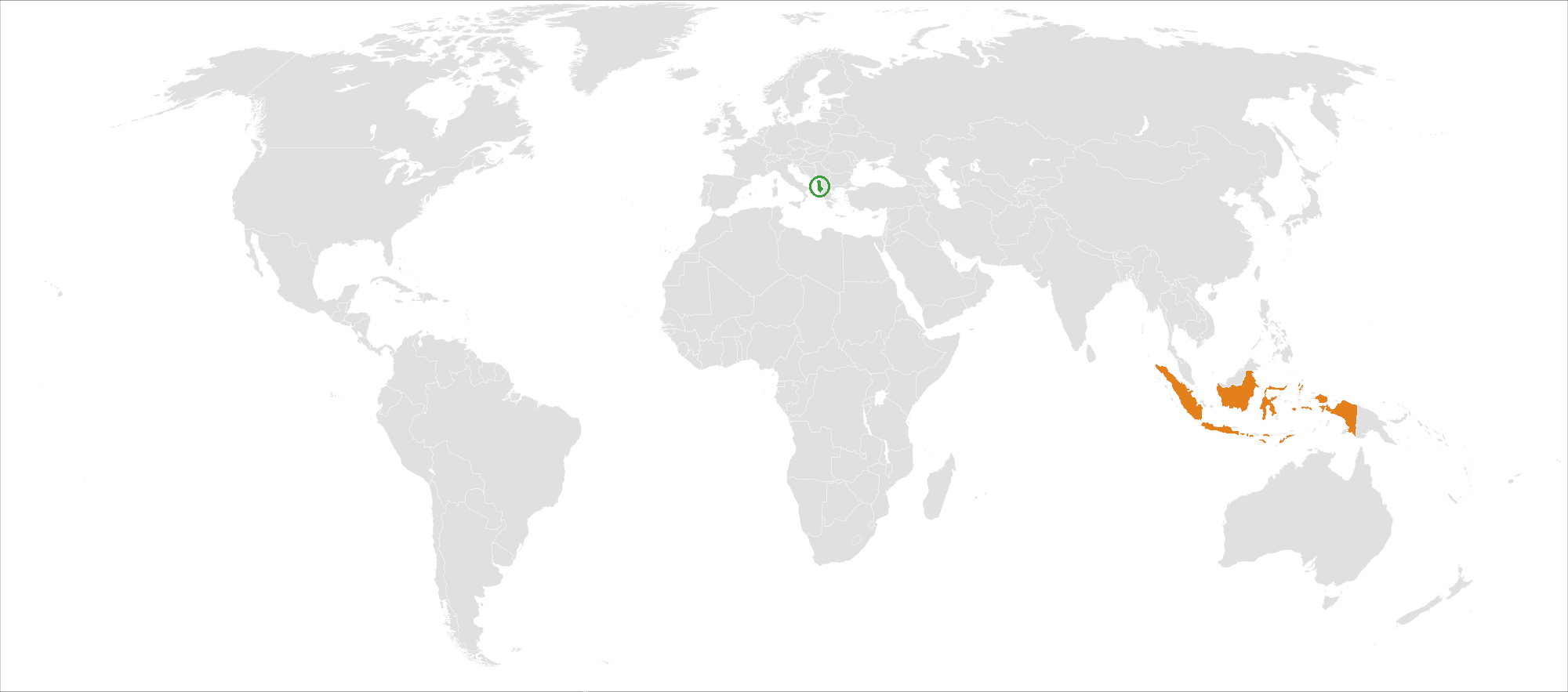
- Albania: Indonesia

Albania–Indonesia relations are the bilateral relations between the Republic of Albania and the Republic of Indonesia. The two countries established formal diplomatic relations in 18 August 1965.

== History ==
Indonesia and Albania formally established diplomatic relations in 1965 and over time have built cooperation through multilateral platforms such as the United Nations and the Organisation of Islamic Cooperation.

A key milestone occurred in 2014, when, on the sidelines of the UN General Assembly, they signed a visa-waiver agreement for diplomats and officials, along with MoUs targeting enhanced cooperation in trade, investment, tourism, education and mutual support in international organizations.

== Diplomatic representation ==
Indonesia has no resident embassy in Albania; its diplomatic accreditation to Albania is handled via its Embassy in Sofia, Bulgaria. In Tirana, Indonesia is served by an Honorary Consulate supervised by the Embassy in Sofia.

Albania does not maintain an embassy in Indonesia, but appointed an Honorary Consulate in Jakarta in June 2012. The consulate provides various consular services by appointment. In 2024, Albania announced plans to open a full embassy in Jakarta as part of expanding its diplomatic presence globally.

== Bilateral agreements and cooperation ==
In 2014, Indonesia and Albania signed:

- A diplomatic visa-waiver agreement (for diplomats and officials).
- MoUs to promote cooperation in trade, investment, education, tourism.
- An agreement to appoint an Indonesian honorary consul in Albania.
- Indonesia views Albania as a strategic point for expansion in the Balkans, and both countries pledged to support each other's candidacies in international bodies, such as Indonesia's bid for a non‑permanent seat on the UN Security Council for 2019–2020.

== Trade and economic ties ==
Indonesia's trade with Albania is relatively small but shows an upward trend in imports from Albania. In 2023, Indonesia's imports from Albania were valued at $0.53 million, a significant increase of 89.29% compared to the previous year. Albania's main exports to Indonesia include footwear, equine and bovine hides, and paper containers. Indonesia also exports goods to Albania, with exports in 2023 reaching $13.21 million, including items like fats and oils, meat and seafood preparations, and furniture.

== Education and cultural relations ==
Albanian students are eligible to apply for Indonesian government scholarships under programs such as Darmasiswa and KNB (Kemitraan Negara Berkembang), fostering cultural and educational exchange.

== Historical connections ==
Following the 1965–66 anti-Communist purge in Indonesia, Tirana became a center for exiled members of the pro‑Chinese faction of the Communist Party of Indonesia (PKI). Around 40 Indonesians lived in exile there during the early 1970s, many organized in the Persatuan Peladjar Indonesia, publishing Indonesian Tribune and Api Pemuda Indonesia. Radio Tirana also broadcast in Indonesian until about 1991.
